The 2022 Oakland Athletics season was the 122nd season for the Oakland Athletics franchise, all as members of the American League. It was their 55th season in Oakland (all at Oakland Coliseum), which surpassed the amount of seasons they played in their original home of Philadelphia (54 seasons). On November 1, 2021, Bob Melvin was hired away from the A's by the San Diego Padres for their manager position. Mark Kotsay was named as Melvin's successor on December 21, 2021.

On December 2, 2021, Commissioner of Baseball Rob Manfred announced a lockout of players, following expiration of the collective bargaining agreement (CBA) between the league and the Major League Baseball Players Association (MLBPA). On March 10, 2022, the MLB and MLBPA agreed to a new collective bargaining agreement, thus ending the lockout. Opening Day was played on April 8. Although MLB previously announced that several series would be cancelled due to the lockout, the agreement provides for a 162-game season, with originally canceled games to be made up via doubleheaders.

The A’s were gutted ahead of the season losing key players such as Matt Olson, Matt Chapman and Chris Bassitt. Owing to this, they failed to improve on their 86-76 record from the previous season. On September 7, they were the first American League team to be eliminated from playoff contention.

The A's also had a poor offensive season as well, batting only .216 as a team and finishing at or near the bottom of the AL in every other offensive category as well. The pitching staff faltered as well, posting a team 4.52 ERA and finishing near the bottom of the AL in most pitching categories.

Offseason

Lockout 

The expiration of the league's collective bargaining agreement (CBA) with the Major League Baseball Players Association occurred on December 1, 2021 with no new agreement in place. As a result, the team owners voted unanimously to lockout the players stopping all free agency and trades. 

The parties came to an agreement on a new CBA on March 10, 2022.

Rule changes 
Pursuant to the new CBA, several new rules were instituted for the 2022 season. The National League will adopt the designated hitter full-time, a draft lottery will be implemented, the postseason will expand from ten teams to twelve, and advertising patches will appear on player uniforms and helmets for the first time.

Season standings

American League West

American League Wild Card

Record against opponents

Game log

|- style="background:#fbb;"
| 1 || April 8 || @ Phillies || 5–9 || Nola (1–0) || Montas (0–1) || — || Citizens Bank Park || 44,232 || 0–1 || L1
|- style="background:#fbb;"
| 2 || April 9 || @ Phillies || 2–4 || Gibson (1–0) || Irvin (0–1) || Knebel (1) || Citizens Bank Park || 41,622 || 0–2 || L2
|- style="background:#bfb;"
| 3 || April 10 || @ Phillies || 4–1 || Jefferies (1–0) || Falter (0–1) || — || Citizens Bank Park || 33,507 || 1–2 || W1
|- style="background:#bfb;"
| 4 || April 11 || @ Rays || 13–2 || Blackburn (1–0) || Patiño (0–1) || — || Tropicana Field || 9,139 || 2–2 || W2
|- style="background:#fbb;"
| 5 || April 12 || @ Rays || 8–9  || Thompson (1–0) || Trivino (0–1) || — || Tropicana Field || 7,588 || 2–3 || L1
|- style="background:#bfb;"
| 6 || April 13 || @ Rays || 4–2 || Montas (1–1) || McClanahan (0–1) || Trivino (1) || Tropicana Field || 8,954 || 3–3 || W1
|- style="background:#bfb;"
| 7 || April 14 || @ Rays || 6–3 || Irvin (1–1) || Fleming (1–1) || Jiménez (1) || Tropicana Field || 8,287 || 4–3 || W2
|- style="background:#fbb;"
| 8 || April 15 || @ Blue Jays || 1–4 || Cimber (3–0) || Jefferies (1–1) || Romano (5) || Rogers Centre || 35,415 || 4–4 || L1
|- style="background:#bfb;"
| 9 || April 16 || @ Blue Jays || 7–5 || Jiménez (1–0) || Merryweather (0–2) || Trivino (2) || Rogers Centre || 32,330 || 5–4 || W1
|- style="background:#fbb;"
| 10 || April 17 || @ Blue Jays || 3–4 || Manoah (2–0) || Oller (0–1) || Romano (6) || Rogers Centre || 27,490 || 5–5 || L1
|- style="background:#bfb;"
| 11 || April 18 || Orioles || 5–1 || Montas (2–1) || Krehbiel (1–1) || — || Oakland Coliseum || 17,503 || 6–5 || W1
|- style="background:#bfb;"
| 12 || April 19 || Orioles || 2–1 || Logue (1–0) || Baumann (1–1) || Jackson (1) || Oakland Coliseum || 3,748 || 7–5 || W2
|- style="background:#fbb;"
| 13 || April 20 || Orioles || 0–1 || Lyles (1–1) || Jefferies (1–2) || López (2) || Oakland Coliseum || 2,703 || 7–6 || L1
|- style="background:#bfb;"
| 14 || April 21 || Orioles || 6–4 || Blackburn (2–0) || Wells (0–2) || Jiménez (2) || Oakland Coliseum || 4,429 || 8–6 || W1
|- style="background:#fbb;"
| 15 || April 22 || Rangers || 1–8 || Otto (1–0) || Oller (0–2) || — || Oakland Coliseum || 7,012 || 8–7 || L1
|- style="background:#fbb;"
| 16 || April 23 || Rangers || 0–2 || Burke (1–0) || Montas (2–2) || Bush (1) || Oakland Coliseum || 9,120 || 8–8 || L2
|- style="background:#bfb;"
| 17 || April 24 || Rangers || 2–0 || Irvin (2–1) || Howard (0–1) || Jiménez (3) || Oakland Coliseum || 11,083 || 9–8 || W1
|- style="background:#fbb;"
| 18 || April 26 || @ Giants || 2–8 || Rodón (3–0) || Jefferies (1–3) || — || Oracle Park || 32,898 || 9–9 || L1
|- style="background:#bfb;"
| 19 || April 27 || @ Giants || 1–0 || Blackburn (3–0) || Long (0–1) || Jiménez (4) || Oracle Park || 32,014 || 10–9 || W1
|- style="background:#fbb;"
| 20 || April 29 || Guardians || 8–9 || Stephan (2–0) || Acevedo (0–1) || Clase (3) || Oakland Coliseum || 12,910 || 10–10 || L1
|- style="background:#fbb;"
| 21 || April 30 || Guardians || 1–3 || Sandlin (1–1) || Jiménez (1–1) || Clase (4) || Oakland Coliseum || 6,707 || 10–11 || L2

|- style="background:#fbb;"
| 22 || May 1 || Guardians || 3–7 || McKenzie (1–2) || Kaprielian (0–1) || – || Oakland Coliseum || 14,945 || 10–12 || L3
|- style="background:#fbb;"
| 23 || May 2 || Rays || 1–6 || Rasmussen (2–1) || Jefferies (1–4) || – || Oakland Coliseum || 2,488 || 10–13 || L4
|- style="background:#fbb;"
| 24 || May 3 || Rays || 7–10  || Kittredge (2–0) || Trivino (0–2) || – || Oakland Coliseum || 2,815 || 10–14 || L5
|- style="background:#fbb;"
| 25 || May 4 || Rays || 0–3 || Feyereisen (2–0) || Jackson (0–1) || Kittredge (4) || Oakland Coliseum || 4,838 || 10–15 || L6
|- style="background:#fbb;"
| 26 || May 6 || @ Twins || 1–2 || Winder (2–0) || Logue (1–1) || Pagán (3) || Target Field || 17,509 || 10–16 || L7
|- style="background:#fbb;"
| 27 || May 7 || @ Twins || 0–1 || Jax (2–0) || Kaprielian (0–2) || Durán (2) || Target Field || 22,272 || 10–17 || L8
|- style="background:#fbb;"
| 28 || May 8 || @ Twins || 3–4 || Stashak (3–0) || Jefferies (1–5) || Pagán (4) || Target Field || 14,295 || 10–18 || L9
|- style="background:#bfb;"
| 29 || May 9 || @ Tigers || 2–0 || Blackburn (4–0) || Pineda (1–2) || Jiménez (5) || Comerica Park || 12,674 || 11–18 || W1
|- style="background:#fbb;"
| 30 || May 10  || Tigers || 0–6 || Skubal (2–2) || Montas (2–3) || – || Comerica Park || 13,844 || 11–19 || L1
|- style="background:#bfb;"
| 31 || May 10  || @ Tigers || 4–1 || Martínez (1–0) || Faedo (0–1) || – || Comerica Park || 13,844 || 12–19 || W1
|- style="background:#bfb;"
| 32 || May 11 || @ Tigers || 9–0 || Logue (2–1) || Wentz (0–1) || – || Comerica Park || 15,375 || 13–19 || W2
|- style="background:#bfb;"
| 33 || May 12 || @ Tigers || 5–3 || Puk (1–0) || Fulmer (1–2) || Jiménez (6) || Comerica Park || 17,565 || 14–19 || W3
|- style="background:#fbb;"
| 34 || May 13 || Angels || 0–2 || Silseth (1–0) || Jefferies (1–6) || Iglesias (8) || Oakland Coliseum || 13,992 || 14–20 || L1
|- style="background:#bfb;"
| 35 || May 14  || Angels || 4–3 || Trivino (1–1) || Iglesias (1–2) || – || Oakland Coliseum || 12,719 || 15–20 || W1
|- style="background:#fbb;"
| 36 || May 14  || Angels || 1–9 || Lorenzen (4–2) || Oller (0–3) || – || Oakland Coliseum || 7,737 || 15–21 || L1
|- style="background:#fbb;"
| 37 || May 15 || Angels || 1–4 || Sandoval (2–1) || Montas (2–4) || Herget (1) || Oakland Coliseum || 14,668 || 15–22 || L2
|- style=background:#fbb;"
| 38 || May 16 || Twins || 1–3 || Cano (1–0) || Logue (2–2) || Duffey (1) || Oakland Coliseum || 3,138 || 15–23 || L3
|- style=background:#bfb;"
| 39 || May 17 || Twins || 5–2 || Jackson (1–1) || Winder (2–2) || Jiménez (7) || Oakland Coliseum || 3,640 || 16–23 || W1
|- style=background:#fbb;"
| 40 || May 18 || Twins || 4–14 || Gray (1–1) || Jefferies (1–7) || – || Oakland Coliseum || 7,106 || 16–24 || L1
|- style="background:#bfb;"
| 41 || May 20 || @ Angels || 4–2 || Moll (1–0) || Silseth (1–1) || Jiménez (8) || Angel Stadium || 32,422 || 17–24 || W1
|- style="background:#fbb;"
| 42 || May 21 || @ Angels || 3–5 || Lorenzen (5–2) || Kolarek (0–1) || Iglesias (9) || Angel Stadium || 39,045 || 17–25 || L1
|- style="background:#fbb;"
| 43 || May 22 || @ Angels || 1–4 || Sandoval (3–1) || Irvin (2–2) || Iglesias (10) || Angel Stadium || 40,042 || 17–26 || L2
|- style="background:#fbb;"
| 44 || May 23 || @ Mariners || 6–7 || Gonzales (3–4) || Logue (2–3) || Sewald (2) || T-Mobile Park || 14,415 || 17–27 || L3
|- style="background:#bfb;"
| 45 || May 24 || @ Mariners || 7–5 || Moll (2–0) || Misiewicz (0–1) || Jiménez (9) || T-Mobile Park || 14,797 || 18–27 || W1
|- style="background:#bfb;"
| 46 || May 25 || @ Mariners || 4–2 || Blackburn (5–0) || Ray (4–5) || Jiménez (10) || T-Mobile Park || 15,856 || 19–27 || W2
|- style="background:#fbb;"
| 47 || May 26 || Rangers || 1–4 || Bush (2–1) || Trivino (1–3) || Barlow (8) || Oakland Coliseum || 3,203 || 19–28 || L1
|- style="background:#fbb;"
| 48 || May 27 || Rangers || 5–8 || Moore (2–0) || Jiménez (1–2) || Santana (1) || Oakland Coliseum || 5,010 || 19–29 || L2
|- style="background:#fbb;"
| 49 || May 28 || Rangers || 4–11 || Hearn (3–3) || Logue (2–4) || – || Oakland Coliseum || 6,502 || 19–30 || L3
|- style="background:#bfb;"
| 50 || May 29 || Rangers || 6–5 || Jiménez (2–2) || Martin (0–4) || – || Oakland Coliseum || 8,342 || 20–30 || W1
|- style="background:#fbb;"
| 51 || May 30 || Astros || 1–5 || Valdez (5–2) || Blackburn (5–1) || – || Oakland Coliseum || 8,753 || 20–31 || L1
|- style="background:#fbb;"
| 52 || May 31 || Astros || 1–3 || Montero (3–0) || Montas (2–5) || Pressly (9) || Oakland Coliseum || 3,469 || 20–32 || L2

|- style=background:#fbb;"
| 53 || June 1 || Astros || 4–5 || Abreu (3–0) || Jiménez (2–3) || Pressly (10) || Oakland Coliseum || 5,189 || 20–33 || L3
|- style="background:#fbb;"
| 54 || June 3 || Red Sox || 2–7 || Eovaldi (3–2) || Kaprielian (0–3) || – || Oakland Coliseum || 17,852 || 20–34 || L4
|- style="background:#fbb;"
| 55 || June 4 || Red Sox || 0–8 || Pivetta (5–4) || Blackburn (5–2) || – || Oakland Coliseum || 14,796 || 20–35 || L5
|- style="background:#fbb;"
| 56 || June 5 || Red Sox || 2–5 || Hill (2–3) || Montas (2–6) || – || Oakland Coliseum || 12,084 || 20–36 || L6
|- style="background:#fbb;"
| 57 || June 7 || @ Braves || 2–3 || Wright (6–3) || Trivino (1–4) || Jansen (15) || Truist Park || 33,981 || 20–37 || L7
|- style="background:#fbb;"
| 58 || June 8 || @ Braves || 2–13 || Anderson (5–3) || Koenig (0–1) || – || Truist Park || 42,075 || 20–38 || L8
|- style="background:#fbb;"
| 59 || June 9 || @ Guardians || 4–8 || De Los Santos (1–0) || Trivino (1–5) || – || Progressive Field || 12,995 || 20–39 || L9
|- style="background:#fbb;"
| 60 || June 10 || @ Guardians || 2–3 || Gose (2–0) || Jiménez (2–4) || – || Progressive Field || 21,311 || 20–40 || L10
|- style="background:#bfb;"
| 61 || June 11 || @ Guardians || 10–5 || Montas (3–6) || Morgan (2–2) || – || Progressive Field || 22,674 || 21–40 || W1
|- style="background:#fbb;"
| 62 || June 12 || @ Guardians || 3–6 || Quantrill (4–3) || Irvin (2–3) || Clase (11) || Progressive Field || 17,775 || 21–41 || L1
|- style="background:#fbb;"
| 63 || June 14 || @ Red Sox || 1–6 || Pivetta (6–5) || Koenig (0–2) || – || Fenway Park || 32,617 || 21–42 || L2
|- style="background:#fbb;"
| 64 || June 15 || @ Red Sox || 1–10 || Winckowski (1–1) || Kaprielian (0–4) || – || Fenway Park || 31,877 || 21–43 || L3
|- style="background:#bfb;"
| 65 || June 16 || @ Red Sox || 4–3 || Blackburn (6–2) || Hill (2–4) || Jiménez (11) || Fenway Park || 30,779 || 22–43 || W1
|- style="background:#fbb;"
| 66 || June 17 || Royals || 1–5 || Lynch (3–6) || Montas (3–7) || – || Oakland Coliseum || 8,772 || 22–44 || L1
|- style="background:#fbb;"
| 67 || June 18 || Royals || 0–2 || Keller (2–8) || Irvin (2–4) || Barlow (8) || Oakland Coliseum || 10,936 || 22–45 || L2
|- style="background:#bfb;"
| 68 || June 19 || Royals || 4–0 || Koenig (1–2) || Singer (3–2) || – || Oakland Coliseum || 14,341 || 23–45 || W1
|- style="background:#fbb;"
| 69 || June 21 || Mariners || 2–8 || Gonzales (4–7) || Kaprielian (0–5) || – || Oakland Coliseum || 4,733 || 23–46 || L1
|- style="background:#fbb;"
| 70 || June 22 || Mariners || 0–9 || Kirby (2–2) || Blackburn (6–3) || – || Oakland Coliseum || 5,414 || 23–47 || L2
|- style="background:#fbb;"
| 71 || June 23 || Mariners || 1–2 || Castillo (4–1) || Jackson (1–2) || Sewald (5) || Oakland Coliseum || 8,215 || 23–48 || L3
|- style="background:#fbb;"
| 72 || June 24 || @ Royals || 1–3 || Greinke (1–4) || Irvin (2–5) || Barlow (9) || Kauffman Stadium || 25,077 || 23–49 || L4
|- style="background:#bfb;"
| 73 || June 25 || @ Royals || 9–7 || Jackson (2–2) || Keller (2–9) || Trivino (3) || Kauffman Stadium || 13,543 || 24–49 || W1
|- style="background:#bfb;"
| 74 || June 26 || @ Royals || 5–3 || Moll (3–0) || Singer (3–3) || Trivino (4) || Kauffman Stadium || 24,820 || 25–49 || W2
|- style="background:#fbb;"
| 75 || June 27 || @ Yankees || 5–9 || Abreu (1–0) || Puk (1–1) || – || Yankee Stadium || 33,168 || 25–50 || L1
|- style="background:#fbb;"
| 76 || June 28 || @ Yankees || 1–2 || Sears (3–0) || Montas (3–8) || Holmes (13) || Yankee Stadium || 38,051 || 25–51 || L2
|- style="background:#fbb;"
| 77 || June 29 || @ Yankees || 3–5 || Taillon (9–1) || Irvin (2–6) || Holmes (14) || Yankee Stadium || 39,647 || 25–52 || L3
|- style="background:#fbb;"
| 78 || June 30 || @ Mariners || 6–8 || Gilbert (9–3) || Martínez (1–1) || Sewald (8) || T-Mobile Park || 20,860 || 25–53 || L4

|- style="background:#bfb;"
| 79 || July 1 || @ Mariners || 3–1 || Kaprielian (1–5) || Gonzales (4–9) || Trivino (5) || T-Mobile Park || 27,589 || 26–53 || W1
|- style="background:#fbb;"
| 80 || July 2 || @ Mariners || 1–2 || Castillo (6–1) || Trivino (1–6) || – || T-Mobile Park || 23,907 || 26–54 || L1
|- style="background:#fbb;"
| 81 || July 3 || @ Mariners || 1–2 || Ray (7–6) || Montas (3–9) || Sewald (9) || T-Mobile Park || 23,333 || 26–55 || L2
|- style="background:#bfb;"
| 82 || July 4 || Blue Jays || 5–1 || Irvin (3–6) || Manoah (9–3) || – || Oakland Coliseum || 24,403 || 27–55 || W1
|- style="background:#bfb;"
| 83 || July 5 || Blue Jays || 5–3 || Martínez (2–1) || Kikuchi (3–5) || Trivino (6) || Oakland Coliseum || 4,846 || 28–55 || W2
|- style="background:#fbb;"
| 84 || July 6 || Blue Jays || 1–2 || Cimber (8–2) || Acevedo (1–2) || Romano (18) || Oakland Coliseum || 6,330 || 28–56 || L1
|- style="background:#fbb;"
| 85 || July 8 || Astros || 3–8 || Urquidy (8–3) || Blackburn (6–4) || – || Oakland Coliseum || 6,012 || 28–57 || L2
|- style="background:#bfb;"
| 86 || July 9 || Astros || 3–2 || Logue (3–4)  || Valdez (8–4) || Trivino (7) || Oakland Coliseum || 10,058 || 29–57 || W1
|- style="background:#fbb;"
| 87 || July 10 || Astros || 1–6 || Odorizzi (4–2) || Irvin (3–7) || – || Oakland Coliseum || 10,195 || 29–58 || L1
|- style="background:#fbb;"
| 88 || July 11 || @ Rangers || 8–10 || Howard (1–1) || Martínez (2–2) || Martin (3) || Globe Life Field || 20,660 || 29–59 || L2
|- style="background:#bfb;"
| 89 || July 12 || @ Rangers || 14–7  || Snead (1–0) || Santana (3–4) || – || Globe Life Field || 17,485 || 30–59 || W1
|- style="background:#fbb;"
| 90 || July 13 || @ Rangers || 2–5 || Gray (6–4) || Blackburn (6–5) || Richards (1) || Globe Life Field || 22,394 || 30–60 || L1
|- style="background:#bfb;"
| 91 || July 15 || @ Astros || 5–1 || Irvin (4–7) || Urquidy (8–4) || – || Minute Maid Park || 39,434 || 31–60 || W1
|- style="background:#fbb;"
| 92 || July 16 || @ Astros || 0–5 || Verlander (12–3) || Koenig (1–3) || – || Minute Maid Park || 39,125 || 31–61 || L1
|- style="background:#bfb;"
| 93 || July 17 || @ Astros || 4–3 || Puk (2–1) || Montero (3–1) || Trivino (8) || Minute Maid Park || 34,534 || 32–61 || W1
|-style=background:#bbbfff
| – || July 19 || colspan="9"|92nd All-Star Game in Los Angeles, CA
|- style="background:#fbb;"
| 94 || July 21  || Tigers || 2–7 || Skubal (7–8) || Logue (3–5) || – || Oakland Coliseum || 7,282 || 32–62 || L1
|- style="background:#bfb;"
| 95 || July 21  || Tigers || 5–0 || Acevedo (2–2) || Hill (1–2) || – || Oakland Coliseum || 7,282 || 33–62 || W1
|- style="background:#bfb;"
| 96 || July 22 || Rangers || 5–4 || Irvin (5–7) || Howard (1–2) || Puk (1) || Oakland Coliseum || 6,620 || 34–62 || W2
|- style="background:#bfb;"
| 97 || July 23 || Rangers || 3–1 || Acevedo (3–2) || Santana (3–6) || Jackson (2) || Oakland Coliseum || 10,190 || 35–62 || W3
|- style="background:#fbb;"
| 98 || July 24 || Rangers || 8–11 || Pérez (8–2) || Blackburn (6–6) || – || Oakland Coliseum || 9,835 || 35–63 || L1
|- style="background:#bfb;"
| 99 || July 25 || Astros || 7–5 || Oller (1–3) || Odorizzi (4–3) || Trivino (9) || Oakland Coliseum || 4,105 || 36–63 || W1
|- style="background:#bfb;"
| 100 || July 26 || Astros || 5–3 || Montas (4–9) || García (8–6) || Trivino (10) || Oakland Coliseum || 5,130 || 37–63 || W2
|- style="background:#bfb;"
| 101 || July 27 || Astros || 4–2 || Irvin (6–7) || Javier (6–6) || Puk (2) || Oakland Coliseum || 9,367 || 38–63 || W3
|- style="background:#bfb;"
| 102 || July 29 || @ White Sox || 7–3 || Kaprielian (2–5) || Lynn (1–4) || – || Guaranteed Rate Field || 28,503 || 39–63 || W4
|- style="background:#fbb;"
| 103 || July 30 || @ White Sox || 2–3 || Hendriks (2–3) || Jackson (2–3) || – || Guaranteed Rate Field || 28,142 || 39–64 || L1
|- style="background:#fbb;"
| 104 || July 31 || @ White Sox || 1–4 || Cease (11–4) || Oller (1–4) || Hendriks (20) || Guaranteed Rate Field || 30,028 || 39–65 || L2

|- style="background:#fbb;"
| 105 || August 2 || @ Angels || 1–3 || Suárez (3–4) || Irvin (6–8) || Quijada (2) || Angel Stadium || 22,920 || 39–66 || L3
|- style="background:#bfb;"
| 106 || August 3 || @ Angels || 3–1 || Kaprielian (3–5) || Ohtani (9–7) || Jackson (3) || Angel Stadium || 25,190 || 40–66 || W1
|- style="background:#bfb;"
| 107 || August 4 || @ Angels || 8–7 || Blackburn (7–6) || Junk (1–1) || Puk (3) || Angel Stadium || 23,849 || 41–66 || W2
|- style="background:#fbb;"
| 108 || August 6 || Giants || 3–7 || Rodón (10–6) || Oller (1–5) || – || Oakland Coliseum || 40,065 || 41–67 || L1
|- style="background:#fbb;"
| 109 || August 7 || Giants || 4–6 || Webb (10–5) || Martínez (2–3) || Doval (14) || Oakland Coliseum || 31,605 || 41–68 || L2
|- style="background:#fbb;"
| 110 || August 8 || Angels || 0–1 || Suárez (4–4) || Irvin (6–9) || Tepera (2) || Oakland Coliseum || 5,440 || 41–69 || L3
|- style="background:#fbb;"
| 111 || August 9 || Angels || 1–5 || Ohtani (10–7) || Kaprielian (3–6) || – || Oakland Coliseum || 9,351 || 41–70 || L4
|- style="background:#fbb;"
| 112 || August 10 || Angels || 4–5  || Barría (2–2) || Pruitt (0–1) || – || Oakland Coliseum || 8,268 || 41–71 || L5
|- style="background:#fbb;"
| 113 || August 12 || @ Astros || 5–7 || García (9–8) || Moll (2–1) || Neris (2) || Minute Maid Park || 31,230 || 41–72 || L6
|- style="background:#fbb;"
| 114 || August 13 || @ Astros || 0–8 || McCullers Jr. (1–0) || Logue (3–6) || – || Minute Maid Park || 34,078 || 41–73 || L7
|- style="background:#fbb;"
| 115 || August 14 || @ Astros || 3–6 || Javier (7–8) || Irvin (6–10) || Pressly (23) || Minute Maid Park || 38,906 || 41–74 || L8
|- style="background:#fbb;"
| 116 || August 15 || @ Rangers || 1–2 || Otto (5–8) || Kaprielian (3–7) || Hernández (4) || Globe Life Field || 13,141 || 41–75 || L9
|- style="background:#bfb;"
| 117 || August 16 || @ Rangers || 5–1 || Sears (4–0) || Arihara (0–1) || – || Globe Life Field || 15,260 || 42–75 || W1
|- style="background:#bfb;"
| 118 || August 17 || @ Rangers || 7–2 || Oller (2–5) || Ragans (0–2) || – || Globe Life Field || 14,846 || 43–75 || W2
|- style="background:#fbb;"
| 119 || August 18 || @ Rangers || 3–10 || Dunning (3–6) || Logue (3–7) || – || Globe Life Field || 16,495 || 43–76 || L1
|- style="background:#fbb;"
| 120 || August 19 || Mariners || 2–10 || Gonzales (8–12) || Irvin (6–11) || – || Oakland Coliseum || 16,912 || 43–77 || L2
|- style="background:#bfb;"
| 121 || August 20 || Mariners || 4–3  || Jiménez (3–4) || Castillo (7–2) || – || Oakland Coliseum || 9,626 || 44–77 || W1
|- style="background:#bfb;"
| 122 || August 21 || Mariners || 5–3 || Sears (5–0) || Castillo (5–5) || Pruitt (1) || Oakland Coliseum || 9,314 || 45–77 || W1
|- style="background:#fbb;"
| 123 || August 22 || Marlins || 0–3 || Cabrera (4–1) || Oller (2–6) || Scott (18) || Oakland Coliseum || 2,630 || 45–78 || L1
|- style="background:#fbb;"
| 124 || August 23 || Marlins || 3–5 || López (8–8) || Logue (3–8) || Scott (19) || Oakland Coliseum || 4,028 || 45–79 || L2
|- style="background:#bfb;"
| 125 || August 24 || Marlins || 3–2  || Puk (3–1) || Bleier (2–2) || – || Oakland Coliseum || 3,901 || 46–79 || W1
|- style="background:#fbb;"
| 126 || August 25 || Yankees || 4–13 || Taillon (12–4) || Kaprielian (3–8) || – || Oakland Coliseum || 10,876 || 46–80 || L1
|- style="background:#fbb;"
| 127 || August 26 || Yankees || 2–3 || Cole (10–6) || Sears (5–1) || Peralta (3) || Oakland Coliseum || 16,821 || 46–81 || L2
|- style="background:#bfb;"
| 128 || August 27 || Yankees || 3–2  || Payamps (3–3) || Trivino (2–8) || – || Oakland Coliseum || 36,529 || 47–81 || W1
|- style="background:#bfb;"
| 129 || August 28 || Yankees || 4–1 || Martínez (3–3) || Schmidt (5–3) || Puk (4) || Oakland Coliseum || 29,498 || 48–81 || W2
|- style="background:#bfb;"
| 130 || August 30 || @ Nationals || 10–6 || Irvin (7–11) || Fedde (5–9) || – || Nationals Park || 26,321 || 49–81 || W3
|- style="background:#fbb;"
| 131 || August 31 || @ Nationals || 1–5 || Sánchez (1–5) || Kaprielian (3–9) || – || Nationals Park || 26,416 || 49–82 || L1

|- style="background:#fbb;"
| 132 || September 1 || @ Nationals || 5–7  || Harvey (1–0) || Ruiz (0–1) || – || Nationals Park || 26,877 || 49–83 || L2
|- style="background:#fbb;"
| 133 || September 2 || @ Orioles || 2–5 || Tate (3–3) || Acevedo (3–3) || – || Camden Yards || 13,558 || 49–84 || L3
|- style="background:#fbb;"
| 134 || September 3 || @ Orioles || 1–8 || Akin (3–1) || Oller (2–7) || – || Camden Yards || 30,853 || 49–85 || L4
|- style="background:#bfb;"
| 135 || September 4 || @ Orioles || 5–0 || Martínez (4–3) || Watkins (4–6) || – || Camden Yards || 19,883 || 50–85 || W1
|- style="background:#fbb;"
| 136 || September 6 || Braves || 9–10 || Chavez (3–1) || Payamps (3–4) || Jansen (32) || Oakland Coliseum || 6,062 || 50–86 || L1
|- style="background:#fbb;"
| 137 || September 7 || Braves || 3–7 || Strider (10–4) || Waldichuk (0–1) || – || Oakland Coliseum || 5,332 || 50–87 || L2
|- style="background:#fbb;"
| 138 || September 8 || White Sox || 2–14 || Cease (14–6) || Sears (5–2) || – || Oakland Coliseum || 4,591 || 50–88 || L3
|- style="background:#fbb;"
| 139 || September 9 || White Sox || 3–5 || Bummer (2–1) || Puk (3–2) || Hendriks (32) || Oakland Coliseum || 11,494 || 50–89 || L4
|- style="background:#fbb;"
| 140 || September 10 || White Sox || 2–10 || Lynn (6–5) || Martínez (4–4) || – || Oakland Coliseum || 11,107 || 50–90 || L5
|- style="background:#bfb;"
| 141 || September 11 || White Sox || 10–3 || Irvin (8–11) || Cueto (7–8) || – || Oakland Coliseum || 11,701 || 51–90 || W1
|- style="background:#fbb;"
| 142 || September 13 || @ Rangers || 7–8 || Burke (7–3) || Payamps (3–5) || – || Globe Life Field || 14,925 || 51–91 || L1
|- style="background:#bfb;"
| 143 || September 14 || @ Rangers || 8–7 || Cyr (1–0) || Leclerc (0–3) || Acevedo (1) || Globe Life Field || 25,700 || 52–91 || W1
|- style="background:#fbb;"
| 144 || September 15 || @ Astros || 2–5 || Martinez (1–1) || Payamps (3–6) || Montero (13) || Minute Maid Park || 26,543 || 52–92 || L1
|- style="background:#fbb;"
| 145 || September 16 || @ Astros || 0–5 || Verlander (17–3) || Martínez (4–5) || – || Minute Maid Park || 33,850 || 52–93 || L2
|- style="background:#bfb;"
| 146 || September 17 || @ Astros || 8–5 || Irvin (9–11) || Urquidy (13–7) || Acevedo (2) || Minute Maid Park || 33,419 || 53–93 || W1
|- style="background:#fbb;"
| 147 || September 18 || @ Astros || 2–11 || Valdez (16–5) || Waldichuk (0–2) || – || Minute Maid Park || 30,375 || 53–94 || L1
|- style="background:#bfb;"
| 148 || September 20 || Mariners || 4–1 || Sears (6–2) || Castillo (7–6) || Acevedo (3) || Oakland Coliseum || 4,251 || 54–94 || W1
|- style="background:#bfb;"
| 149 || September 21 || Mariners || 2–1 || Kaprielian (4–9) || Swanson (2–1) || Acevedo (4) || Oakland Coliseum || 4,030 || 55–94 || W1
|- style="background:#fbb;"
| 150 || September 22 || Mariners || 5–9 || Boyd (2–0) || Snead (1–1) || – || Oakland Coliseum || 4,696 || 55–95 || L1
|- style="background:#fbb;"
| 151 || September 23 || Mets || 2–9 || Bassitt (15–8) || Irvin (9–12) || – || Oakland Coliseum || 18,107 || 55–96 || L2
|- style="background:#bfb;"
| 152 || September 24 || Mets || 10–4 || Waldichuk (1–2) || deGrom (5–3) || – || Oakland Coliseum || 16,041 || 56–96 || W1
|- style="background:#fbb;"
| 153 || September 25 || Mets || 4–13 || Scherzer (11–4) || Sears (6–3) || – || Oakland Coliseum || 13,942 || 56–97 || L1
|- style="background:#fbb;"
| 154 || September 27 || @ Angels || 3–4 || Tepera (5–3) || Puk (3–3) || Herget (7) || Angel Stadium || 19,374 || 56–98 || L2
|- style="background:#fbb;"
| 155 || September 28 || @ Angels || 1–4 || Lorenzen (8–6) || Martínez (4–6) || Herget (8) || Angel Stadium || 23,573 || 56–99 || L3
|- style="background:#fbb;"
| 156 || September 29 || @ Angels || 2–4 || Ohtani (15–8) || Irvin (9–13) || Tepera (5) || Angel Stadium || 31,293 || 56–100 || L4
|- style="background:#fbb;"
| 157 || September 30 || @ Mariners || 1–2 || Brash (4–4) || Acevedo (3–4) || – || T-Mobile Park || 44,754 || 56–101 || L5

|- style="background:#fbb;"
| 158 || October 1 || @ Mariners || 1–5 || Castillo (8–6) || Oller (2–8) || – || T-Mobile Park || 42,512 || 56–102 || L6
|- style="background:#bfb;"
| 159 || October 2 || @ Mariners || 10–3 || Kaprielian (5–9) || Ray (12–12) || – || T-Mobile Park || 42,465 || 57–102 || W1
|- style="background:#bfb;"
| 160 || October 3 || Angels || 5–4  || Acevedo (4–4) || Weiss (0–1) || – || Oakland Coliseum || 6,978 || 58–102 || W2
|- style="background:#bfb;"
| 161 || October 4 || Angels || 2–1  || Puk (4–3) || Tepera (5–4) || – || Oakland Coliseum || 8,189 || 59–102 || W3
|- style="background:#bfb;"
| 162 || October 5 || Angels || 3–2 || Waldichuk (2–2) || Ohtani (15–9) || Snead (1) || Oakland Coliseum || 11,232 || 60–102 || W4

|- style="text-align:center;"
| Legend:       = Win       = Loss       = PostponementBold = Athletics team member

Roster

Statistics
Updated through October 5.

Batting
Stats in bold are the team leaders.

Note: G = Games played; AB = At bats; R = Runs; H = Hits; 2B = Doubles; 3B = Triples; HR = Home runs; RBI = Runs batted in; BB = Walks; SO = Strikeouts; SB = Stolen bases; Avg. = Batting average; OBP = On-base percentage; SLG = Slugging; OPS = On base + slugging

Pitching
Stats in bold are the team leaders.

Note: W = Wins; L = Losses; ERA = Earned run average; G = Games pitched; GS = Games started; SV = Saves; IP = Innings pitched; H = Hits allowed; R = Runs allowed; ER = Earned runs allowed; BB = Walks allowed; K = Strikeouts

Farm system

Source:

References

External links
2022 Oakland Athletics season at Baseball Reference

Oakland Athletics seasons
Oakland Athletics
2020s in Oakland, California
Oakland Athletics